Heraldic courtesy or courtoisie (French) is a practice typical of the heraldry of Germany (or more generally the former Holy Roman Empire), in which coats of arms are mirrored if necessary so that animate charges, such as lions, face the center of a composition.  This may be done in arms of alliance (displaying the two shields of a married couple), as in the first illustration here; or within a single shield, such as that of the dukes of Guelders and Jülich in which the gold lion of Guelders turns to face the black lion of Jülich.

See also
Arms of alliance

References

Heraldry